Steven Lloyd Gayle (born 19 March 1994) is a Jamaican sprinter specialising in the 400 metres. He represented his country at the 2017 World Championships and 2018 World Indoor Championships.

International competitions

Personal bests
Outdoor
200 metres – 20.48 (+0.2 m/s, Tallahassee 2017)
400 metres – 44.99 (Lexington 2017)
Indoor
200 metres – 21.37 (Birmingham 2017)
400 metres – 46.02 (College Station 2017)

References

1994 births
Living people
Jamaican male sprinters
World Athletics Championships athletes for Jamaica
Jamaican expatriates in the United States
Competitors at the 2018 Central American and Caribbean Games
South Plains College alumni
Alabama Crimson Tide men's track and field athletes